Aleksandar Tomov Lazarov (born 3 April 1949) is a former Bulgarian Greco-Roman wrestler, in the heavyweight class. 

He is in the FILA Hall of Fame as a five-time champion of the World and five-time champion of Europe. He won silver medals at the Olympics in the +100 kg class in 1972, 1976, and 1980.

References

External links 
 

People from Sandanski
Wrestlers at the 1972 Summer Olympics
Wrestlers at the 1976 Summer Olympics
Wrestlers at the 1980 Summer Olympics
Bulgarian male sport wrestlers
1949 births
Living people
Olympic medalists in wrestling
Macedonian Bulgarians
Olympic silver medalists for Bulgaria
Olympic wrestlers of Bulgaria
World Wrestling Championships medalists
Medalists at the 1980 Summer Olympics
Medalists at the 1976 Summer Olympics
Medalists at the 1972 Summer Olympics
Sportspeople from Blagoevgrad Province
20th-century Bulgarian people
21st-century Bulgarian people